The Dukes of Castel Duino are a noble family in Italy descending from the Bohemian line of the Princely House of Thurn and Taxis.

History 
The title was created along with the additional title of Principe della Torre e Tasso in 1934 for Prince Alexander of Thurn and Taxis following his naturalisation in the Kingdom of Italy. The second duke, Raimondo, married Princess Eugénie of Greece and Denmark a member of the Greek Royal Family.

The seat of the family is Duino Castle in Duino in the Province of Trieste, Friuli-Venezia Giulia.

Dukes of Castel Duino (1934-present) 

 Prince Alessandro della Torre e Tasso, 1st Duke of Castel Duino (1881-1937), son of Prince Alexander Johann of Thurn and Taxis and Princess Marie of Hohenlohe-Waldenburg- Schillingsfürst
 Prince Raimondo della Torre e Tasso, 2nd Duke of Castel Duino (1907-1986)
 Prince Carlo Alessandro della Torre e Tasso, 3rd Duke of Castel Duino (born 1952)

The heir is Prince Dimitri della Torre e Tasso (born 1977).

References

External links 
 Duino Castle

 
Duke of Castel Duino
Noble titles created in 1923